Esmeraldas is a Brazilian municipality located in the state of Minas Gerais. The city belongs to the mesoregion Metropolitana de Belo Horizonte and to the microregion of Belo Horizonte. In 2020 its population was estimated to be 71,551 inhabitants.

See also
 List of municipalities in Minas Gerais

References

Municipalities in Minas Gerais